Flight 897 may refer to

Standard Air Lines Flight 897R, crashed on 12 July 1949
Viasa Flight 897, crashed on 30 May 1961

0897